The Canada women's national baseball team represents Canada in international baseball. They are overseen by Baseball Canada, the governing body of baseball in Canada.

Competitive record

World Cup

Pan American Games

Awards and honours
 Amanda Asay, Finalist, 2006 Tip O'Neill Award
 Amanda Asay, 2006 IBAF World Cup Tournament All-Star (First Base)
 Kate Psota, 2010 IBAF World Cup Tournament All-Star (First Base)
 Kate Psota, 2012 IBAF World Cup Tournament All-Star (First Base)
 Ashley Stephenson, 2008 IBAF World Cup Tournament All-Star (Third Base)
 Ashley Stephenson, Jimmy Rattlesnake Award

Team MVP

Rosters

2015 Pan American Games 
The Canada women's national baseball team announced their roster for the 2015 Pan American Games on May 17, 2015. The final roster (as of July 19, 2015): 

 Melissa Armstrong (P)
 Amanda Asay (P/IF)
 Jessica  Bérubé (P)
 Veronika Boyd (OF)
 Claire Eccles (P)
 Jenna Flannigan (OF)
 Rebecca Hartley (OF)
 Jennifer Gilroy (C)
 Kelsey Lalor (OF)
 Nicole  Luchanski (IF)
 Daniella Matteucci (OF)
 Autumn Mills (P)
 Heidi Northcott (P)
 Katherine Psota (IF)
 Stéphanie Savoie (C)
 Ashley Stephenson (IF)
 Vanessa Riopel (P)
 Bradi Wall (IF)

Legend: C = Catcher, IF = Infielder, OF = Outfielder, P = Pitcher

References

Women's national baseball teams
Baseball
Canada national baseball team
Women's baseball in Canada